The Apostolic Fathers, also known as the Ante-Nicene Fathers, were core Christian theologians among the Church Fathers who lived in the 1st and 2nd centuries AD who are believed to have personally known some of the Twelve Apostles or to have been significantly influenced by them. Their writings, though widely circulated in early Christianity, were not included in the canon of the New Testament. Many of the writings derive from the same time period and geographical location as other works of early Christian literature which came to be part of the New Testament.

Background 
The label Apostolic Fathers has been applied to these writers only since the 17th century, to indicate that they were thought of as representing the generation that had personal contact with the Twelve Apostles. The earliest known use of the term "Apostolic(al) Fathers" was by William Wake in 1693, when he was chaplain in ordinary to King William and Queen Mary of England. According to the Catholic Encyclopedia, the use of the term Apostolic Fathers can be traced to the title of a 1672 work by Jean-Baptiste Cotelier, SS. Patrum qui temporibus apostolicis floruerunt opera ("Works of the holy fathers who flourished in the apostolic times"), which was abbreviated to Bibliotheca Patrum Apostolicorum (Library of the Apostolic Fathers) by L. J. Ittig in his 1699 edition of the same. The term "apostolic father" first occurs in the Hogedos of Anastasius of the seventh-century, however states that it was never used to refer to a body of writings until later.

The history of the title for these writers was explained by Joseph Lightfoot, in his 1890 translation of the Apostolic Fathers' works:

...[T]he expression ['Apostolic Fathers'] itself does not occur, so far as I have observed, until comparatively recent times.  Its origin, or at least its general currency, should probably be traced to the idea of gathering together the literary remains of those who flourished in the age immediately succeeding the Apostles, and who presumably therefore were their direct personal disciples. This idea first took shape in the edition of Cotelier during the last half of the seventeenth century (A.D. 1672).  Indeed such a collection would have been an impossibility a few years earlier. The first half of that century saw in print for the first time the Epistles of Clement (A.D. 1633), and of Barnabas (A.D. 1645), to say nothing of the original Greek of Polycarp's Epistle (A.D. 1633) and the Ignatian Letters in their genuine form (A.D. 1644, 1646).  The materials therefore would have been too scanty for such a project at any previous epoch.  In his title page however Cotelier does not use the actual expression, though he approximates to it, SS. Patrum qui temporibus Apostolicis floruerunt opera; but the next editor [Thomas] Ittig (1699), adopts as his title Patres Apostolici, and thenceforward it becomes common.

List of works

The following writings are generally grouped together as having been written by the Apostolic Fathers (in italics are writings whose authors are unknown): 

 
Letters attributed to Clement of Rome
The First Epistle of Clement
The Second Epistle of Clement (not actually written by Clement; see § Clement of Rome)
Seven epistles of Ignatius of Antioch (the longer forms of these Epistles, and those beyond the seven, are widely considered later emendations and forgeries)
The Martyrium Ignatii
The Epistle of Polycarp
The Martyrdom of Polycarp
Fragments of the writings of Papias of Hierapolis, which have survived as quotations in later writers
One short fragment of the Apology of Quadratus of Athens
The Didache
The Epistle of Barnabas
The Epistle to Diognetus
The Shepherd of Hermas

Additionally some have argued that the Odes of Solomon was written by a student of the Apostle John around the middle of the first century.

All or most of these works were originally written in Greek. Older English translations of these works can be found online in the Ante-Nicene Fathers series on the Christian Classics Ethereal Library website. Published English translations have also been made by various scholars of early Christianity, such as Joseph Lightfoot, Kirsopp Lake, Bart D. Ehrman and Michael W. Holmes. The first English translation of the Apostolic Fathers' works was published in 1693, by William Wake, then rector of Westminster St James, later Archbishop of Canterbury. It was virtually the only English translation available until the mid-19th century. Since its publication many better manuscripts of the Apostolic Fathers' works have been discovered.

There are several Greek text editions:
 The Apostolic Fathers. Vol. 1. I Clement. II Clement. Ignatius. Polycarp. Didache. Barnabas. Loeb Classical Library. Cambridge: Harvard University Press, 1912 Kirsopp Lake
 The Apostolic Fathers. Vol. 2. Shepherd of Hermas. Martyrdom of Polycarp. Epistle to Diognetus. Loeb Classical Library. Cambridge: Harvard University Press, 1913 Kirsopp Lake
 The Apostolic Fathers. Vol. 1. I Clement. II Clement. Ignatius. Polycarp. Didache. Loeb Classical Library. Cambridge: Harvard University Press, 2003 Bart Ehrman (replaced Lake)
 The Apostolic Fathers. Vol. 2. Epistle of Barnabas. Papias and Quadratus. Epistle to Diognetus. The Shepherd of Hermas. Loeb Classical Library. Cambridge: Harvard University Press, 2005 Bart Ehrman (replaced Lake)
The Apostolic Fathers: Greek Texts and English Translations. 3rd Edition. Grand Rapids: Baker, 2007 Michael Holmes
Die Apostolischen Väter. Tübingen: Mohr Siebeck, 1992 Andreas Lindemann and Henning Paulsen (German)

Fathers

Clement of Rome
Clement of Rome (c. 35-99) was bishop of Rome from 88 to 99. Irenaeus and Tertullian list him as the fourth bishop after Peter, Linus and Anacletus. He was said to have been consecrated by Peter the Apostle, and he is known to have been a leading member of the church in Rome in the late 1st century.

The First Epistle of Clement was copied and widely read and is generally considered to be the oldest Christian epistle in existence outside of the New Testament. The letter is extremely lengthy, twice as long as the Epistle to the Hebrews, and it demonstrates the author's familiarity with many books of both the Old Testament and New Testament. The epistle repeatedly refers to the Old Testament as scripture and includes numerous references to the Book of Judith, thereby establishing usage or at least familiarity with Judith in his time. Within the letter, Clement calls on the Christians of Corinth to maintain harmony and order. Tradition identifies the author as Clement, bishop of Rome, and scholarly consensus is overwhelmingly in favor of the letter's authenticity. 

The Second Epistle of Clement was traditionally ascribed by some ancient authors to Clement, but it is now generally considered to have been written later, and therefore could not be the work of Clement, who died in 99. Doubts about the authorship of the letter had already been expressed in antiquity by Eusebius and Jerome. Whereas 1 Clement was an epistle, 2 Clement appears to be a transcript of an oral homily or sermon, making it the oldest surviving Christian sermon outside of the New Testament.

Ignatius of Antioch
Ignatius of Antioch (also known as Theophorus, from the Greek for God-bearer) was bishop of Antioch. He may have known the apostle John directly, and his thought is certainly influenced by the tradition associated with this apostle. En route to his martyrdom in Rome, Ignatius wrote a series of letters which have been preserved as an example of the theology of the earliest Christians. Important topics addressed in these letters include ecclesiology, the sacraments, the role of bishops, and the nature of biblical Sabbath. He clearly identifies the local-church hierarchy composed of bishop, presbyters, and deacons and claims to have spoken in some of the churches through the inspiration of the Holy Spirit. He is the second after Clement to mention the Pauline epistles.

Polycarp of Smyrna

Polycarp ( – ) was bishop of Smyrna (now İzmir in Turkey). His student Irenaeus wrote that he "was not only instructed by the apostles, and conversed with many who had seen the Lord, but was also appointed bishop by apostles in Asia and in the church in Smyrna",<ref>[http://www.newadvent.org/fathers/0103303.htm Adversus haereses, 3:3:4]</ref> and that he had, as a boy, listened to "the accounts which (Polycarp) gave of his intercourse with John and with the others who had seen the Lord". The options for this John are John the son of Zebedee, traditionally viewed as the author of the Fourth Gospel, or John the Presbyter. Traditional advocates follow Eusebius in insisting that the apostolic connection of Papius was with John the Evangelist, and that this John, the author of the Gospel of John, was the same as the apostle John. 

Polycarp tried and failed to persuade Anicetus, bishop of Rome, to have the West celebrate Easter on 14 Nisan, as in the East. He rejected the bishop's suggestion that the East use the Western date. In 155, the Smyrnans demanded Polycarp's execution as a Christian, and he died a martyr. His story has it that the flames built to kill him refused to burn him, and that when he was stabbed to death, so much blood issued from his body that it quenched the flames around him. Polycarp is recognized as a saint in both the Roman Catholic and Eastern Orthodox churches.

 Papias of Hierapolis 
Papias of Hierapolis (c. 60 - c. 130) was bishop of Hierapolis (now Pamukkale in Turkey). Irenaeus describes him as "an ancient man who was a hearer of John and a companion of Polycarp". Eusebius adds that Papias was Bishop of Hierapolis around the time of Ignatius of Antioch. The name Papias (Παπίας) was very common in the region, suggesting that he was probably a native of the area.

Papias's major work was the Exposition of the Sayings of the Lord (Greek: Λογίων Κυριακῶν Ἐξήγησις) in five books; it has been lost and only survives in excerpts from Iraeneus and Eusebius. Other fragments come from the works of Philip of Side and George Hamartolos, but the authenticity of those are dubious.

 Quadratus of Athens 
Quadratus of Athens (died c. 129) was bishop of Athens. Eusebius reports that he was a disciple of the apostles (auditor apostolorum) and that he was appointed as bishop after the martyrdom of his predecessor Publius.Eusebius, Church History, Book 4, Chapter 23 Quadratus's major work is the Apology, which was apparently read to Emperor Hadrian to convince him to improve imperial policy toward Christians. It has been lost and only survives in an excerpt from Eusebius.
 Other sub-apostolic literature 

Didache
The Didache is a brief early Christian treatise, dated anywhere from as early as AD 50 to the end of the 1st century. It contains instructions for Christian communities. The text, parts of which may have constituted the first written catechism, has three main sections dealing with Christian lessons, rituals such as baptism and the Eucharist, and church organization. It was considered by some of the Church Fathers as part of the New Testament but rejected as spurious (non-canonical) by others. Scholars knew of the Didache through references in other texts, but the text had been lost; it was rediscovered in 1873 by Philotheos Bryennios, Metropolitan of Nicomedia, in the Codex Hierosolymitanus.

Shepherd of Hermas
The 2nd-century The Shepherd of Hermas was popular in the early church and was even considered scriptural by some of the Church Fathers such as Irenaeus and Tertullian. It was written in Rome in Koine Greek. The Shepherd had great authority in the 2nd and 3rd centuries. The work comprises five visions, 12 mandates, and 10 parables. It relies on allegory and pays special attention to the Church, calling the faithful to repent of the sins that have harmed it.

See also

 Christian apologetics
 Doctor of the Church
 Ante-Nicene Fathers (book) Ecumenical Councils
 Nicene and Post-Nicene Fathers''

References

Notes

Citations

External links

Catholic Encyclopedia: Apostolic Fathers
 This contains a more detailed exegesis of the writings.
Apostolic Fathers in the Christian Cyclopedia
SBL Apostolic Fathers Section

 
 
Christian terminology